Diamond in the Ruff is the fourth studio album by American hip hop recording artist Freeway, released worldwide by Babygrande Records on November 27, 2012.

Conception

Background
As the ex-Roc-A-Fella artist signed one-album deal with Babygrande Records in July 2012,  Diamond In the Ruff represents his first full-length project since 2010's critically acclaimed The Stimulus Package, a collaborative album with Seattleite producer Jake One.  The album includes features from Wale, Marsha Ambrosius, Vivian Green, Suzann Christine, Nikki Jean, Miss Daja Thomas, Alonda Rich, and fellow Philadelphian artists Neef Buck and Musiq Soulchild. The production is handled by the likes of Jake One, Needlz, as well as Bink! and Just Blaze, who have both worked on his debut album. Gimel "Young Guru" Keaton, the sound engineer behind 10 of Jay-Z’s 11 albums, was slated to mix the entirety of the project. In 2010, Freeway told SLAM Magazine "the whole album is soulful and real. It's [him], and it's different than what everyone else is doing". In a video interview with KarmaLoop TV, he expressed that the album should have come after Philadelphia Freeway (2003).

Title significance
During an interview with Canada's The Come Up Show, Freeway provided some insight into the project's title. "I feel [that this is symbolic in relation] to my career. I'm a diamond in the rough. I'm still shining [despite] all the things [I experienced]. Life is [a daily] struggle. Even just being famous and maintaining, staying on top of your game. It takes a lot. And through all that [I have lived, I always shine], so we chose Diamond In the Ruff."

Promotion
In anticipation of the album's release, a mixtape sponsored by KarmaLoop Music and Rocksmith clothing, entitled Freedom of Speech, was released on October 16, 2012. Freeway offered another mixtape entirely mixed by Statik Selektah on November 23, 2012. Entitled The History Of Freeway, it contains thirty-four pieces that were selected from the rapper's discography.

A tour was planned in support of the album; the first half began on October 12 in Atlanta and concluded on November 13 in New York.

Promotional singles
In 2010, two songs, produced by Jake One, were released under Rhymesayers Entertainment to promote the album, both of which have had videos made for them by Jimmy Giambrone.  The first one was entitled "Beautiful Music". The single was made available on October 4, 2011 as digital download on iTunes.  It was leaked on September 28, 2010 as an exclusive at Nahright.com and the music video premiered the same date at OnSMASH.com. The second song was "Escalators". It contains a vocal sample of The Notorious B.I.G.'s "You're Nobody (Til Somebody Kills You)" in the hook. The song and its accompanying music video premiered on October 19, 2010 at RapRadar.com and became available on iTunes on October 11, 2011.

Singles
The lead single, "Jungle", produced by Incredible Stro, premiered on October 12, 2012 at Babygrande Records' SoundCloud page and was made available on iTunes on October 15, 2012. Its music video, directed by Jimmy Giambrone, premiered on November 19, 2012 at the label's YouTube channel.

The second single is "Numbers", featuring longtime collaborator Neef Buck and produced by Sunny Dukes. It was premiered at the label's Soundcloud page on November 13, 2012.

Critical reception

Diamond In the Ruff was met with generally favorable reviews from music critics. At Metacritic, which assigns a normalized rating out of 100 to reviews from mainstream critics, the album received an average score of 65, based on 6 reviews. Jayson Greene of Pitchfork gave the album a 5.3 out of ten, saying "Freeway is still nowhere near close to sucking. But he's well on his way to not mattering." Jason Lymangrover of Allmusic gave the album three out of five stars, saying "Switching to a smaller label is generally not a sign of good fortune in the rap world, but Freeway continues to be interesting enough with his gruff, dexterous style of storytelling to make a solid impact as an underground artist." Eric Diep of XXL gave the album an XL, saying "For dedicated troupers of Philadelphia Freeway, there’s enough here to satisfy."

Pete T. of RapReviews gave the album a 7.5 out of 10, saying "There's far more good here than bad, but there's definitely a sense of familiarity to "His execution and consistency deserve nothing but the highest praise, and while I'm still awaiting the record where Freeway fulfills his massive potential, "Diamond in the Ruff" is a worthy addition to a catalog that includes a few of my very favorite records of the last decade." King Eljay of AllHipHop gave the album an eight out of ten, saying "Freeway’s been consistent, and he’s saved some of his best music of the year for Diamond In The Ruff. With great production from Jake One, Mike Jerz, and more, alongside the cameo appearances cited above, this is a dope play from start to finish."

Track listing

Personnel
Credits for Diamond In the Ruff adapted from Allmusic.

 Freeway — executive producer, primary artist
 Chuck Wilson — A&R, executive producer
 Chris Isidori — A&R
 Ruddy Rock — A&R
 Bob Macc — mastering
 Dragan "Chach" Cacinovic — mixing
 Rocklogic — mixing
 Colino Fresh — mixing
 Mike Jerz — mixing, producer
 Needlz — mixing, producer
 Incredible Stro — producer
 Bink! — producer
 Jake One — producer
 Just Blaze — producer
 Sunny Dukes — producer
 DJ Khalil — composer, producer
 Gregory Spearman — composer

 Hanif Muhammad — composer
 J. Dutton — composer
 Stephen Tucker — composer
 Alonda Rich — composer, featured artist
 Miss Daja Thomas — composer, featured artist
 Suzanne Christine — composer, featured artist
 Vivian Green — composer, featured artist
 Marsha Ambrosius — featured artist
 Musiq Soulchild — featured artist
 Neef Buck — featured artist
 Nikki Jean — featured artist
 Dion — vocals
 Alrenzo Albritton — instrumentation
 Ben Delfin — design
 Jeremy Gerson — product manager
 Oluwaseye Olusa — photography

Charts

References

External links
 Babygrande Records official site

2012 albums
Freeway (rapper) albums
Babygrande Records albums
Albums produced by Jake One
Albums produced by Just Blaze
Albums produced by DJ Khalil
Albums produced by Needlz
Albums produced by Bink (record producer)